The 1984 North American Soccer League season was the 72nd season of FIFA-sanctioned soccer, the 17th with a national first-division league, in the United States and Canada. It would be the 17th and final season of the NASL.

Changes from the previous season

New teams
None

Teams folding
Montreal Manic
Seattle Sounders
Team America

Teams moving
Fort Lauderdale to Minnesota

Name changes
None

Season recap
By 1983, the NASL had shrunk to half of the 24 teams that made up the league in 1980. The ongoing salary war with the Major Indoor Soccer League had taken its toll, along with shrinking attendances and a lack of interest from American network TV broadcasters. The league made plans to have both an outdoor and indoor presence, with a 24-game outdoor season and 40-game indoor season scheduled for 1984 and beyond.

The off-season following the 1983 outdoor playoffs saw three more teams fall by the wayside: the Montreal Manic, Seattle Sounders and Team America would all fold. The Fort Lauderdale Strikers decided to move to Minnesota because of a lack of suitable indoor arenas in Southeastern Florida. Things had gotten so bad for the league that the champion Tulsa Roughnecks almost folded two weeks after winning the Soccer Bowl. They survived, thanks to a fundraiser that put $65,000 in the team's coffers. The league would soldier on with nine teams. While there would not be huge changes on the field, the single game Soccer Bowl would be no more. The league moved to a best-of-three championship series format, as was done back in the 1971 Final. The revised NASL playoff format had the two division winners and the two next best teams qualify. The four teams would be seeded 1 through 4.

When the season finally got underway in May, the nine teams were bunched together for most of the year as six teams finished within five points of each other. A hoped-for renaissance in New York never materialized, as the return of former Cosmos coach Eddie Firmani did not lead the team back to the playoffs. Rumors about a possible return by Pelé proved to be without merit. However, not everyone struggled on the field. In Oakland, Steve Zungul and Branko Segota were able to translate their talents from the MISL to the outdoor game, finishing 1–2 in the league's scoring race. Zungul would earn league MVP honors despite the Golden Bay Earthquakes' last-place finish. For the fifth time (and second year in a row), the NASL's points system rewarded a team other than the one with the best record (Chicago instead of San Diego) the regular season title and number one playoff seed. Moreover, Toronto and Minnesota also had better won-loss records than Chicago. Minnesota would not even qualify for the playoffs, despite having a better record than both Chicago and Vancouver.

The Chicago Sting won the last NASL title with a two-game sweep over the Toronto Blizzard. The Sting needed a last-second victory over the Cosmos in their regular season finale to qualify for the playoffs and knock New York out. In the playoffs they won a deciding game over the Vancouver Whitecaps, who themselves only made the playoffs thanks to the Cosmos' loss. Vancouver's Bob Lenarduzzi scored the quickest goal in NASL playoff history 46 seconds into the match, but Chicago rallied for the win.

There were still plans for a 1985 outdoor season as the year ended, but the departures of Chicago Sting, Minnesota Strikers, New York Cosmos and the San Diego Sockers to the MISL for the indoor season made that difficult. The Cosmos left both the NASL and MISL on February 22.  A month later, on March 28, 1985, the NASL suspended operations when only Toronto and Minnesota were interested in fielding teams for a 1985 "outdoor" season.

Regular season
W = Wins, L = Losses, GF = Goals For, GA = Goals Against, BP = Bonus Points, Pts= point system

6 points for a win,
4 points for a shootout win,
0 points for a loss,
1 point for each regulation goal scored up to three per game.
-Premiers (most points). -Best record. -Other playoff team. -Tied for best record but did not qualify for playoffs.

Scoring Leaders
GP = Games Played, G = Goals (worth 2 points), A = Assists (worth 1 point), Pts = Points

Leading Goalkeepers
Note: GP = Games played; Min - Minutes played; GA = Goals against; GAA = Goals against average; W = Wins; L = Losses; SO = Shutouts

All-NASL Teams

Playoffs
Top team from each division qualified automatically. The next two teams with the highest point totals qualified regardless of which division they were in.

Bracket

Semifinals

Soccer Bowl Series '84

Game One

Game Two

1984 NASL Champions: Chicago Sting

Playoff Scoring Leaders
GP = Games Played, G = Goals (worth 2 points), A = Assists (worth 1 point), Pts = Points

Playoff Leading Goalkeepers
Note: GP = Games played; Min - Minutes played; GA = Goals against; GAA = Goals against average; W = Wins; L = Losses; SO = Shutouts

Post season awards
Most Valuable Player: Steve Zungul, Golden Bay
Coach Of The Year: Ron Newman, San Diego
Rookie Of The Year: Roy Wegerle, Tampa Bay
North American Player of the Year:  Branko Šegota, Golden Bay

Team Attendance Totals

References

External links
 The Year in American Soccer – 1984
 Chris Page's NASL Archive
 Complete Results and Standings

 
North American Soccer League (1968–1984) seasons
1984 in American soccer leagues
1984 in Canadian soccer